Bottom Live – The Stage Show is a live stage show based on the UK TV series Bottom. It ran in 1993 and was recorded for VHS (and later DVD) release at the Mayflower Theatre in Southampton. It was written by its stars, Rik Mayall as Richie Richard and Adrian Edmondson as Eddie Hitler.

Plot 

Following a weekend lock-in in the lavatories of their local pub, Richie and Eddie return to their flat. After they unsuccessfully attempt to prepare breakfast the mail arrives, containing a letter and parcel for Richie. The letter is from the solicitors, which Eddie is left to dispose of, and the parcel contains a blow-up doll Richie ordered without his flatmate's knowledge. He bribes Eddie to leave the flat so he can be alone with his new friend Monica, unaware that Eddie has opened the solicitors' letter and discovered that following his uncle's death, Richie is now owed £15,000, which he wishes to claim for himself.

The second act opens with Richie having trouble with Monica; ultimately he accidentally attaches himself to the doll with superglue. Eddie returns intending to kill him to claim the £15,000. He helps remove the doll, then tries to poison Richie, albeit unsuccessfully. When Richie himself reads the solicitors' letter, he discovers that the £15,000 is actually a debt Richie owes, as his uncle never paid it during his lifetime. He resigns himself to suicide, but not before Eddie has tricked him into signing a marriage certificate (assuming it was an adoption certificate and that such a bond will entitle him to the money). The play ends with Eddie realising his mistake, and the pair apparently electrocute themselves to avoid paying the debt that they both now owe.

Trivia 
An eight-minute section of the second act revolves around Ade teasing Rik for corpsing during his lines and Rik's annoyance at Ade for receiving a large round of applause from the audience when he delivers his own lines in an overly-dramatic fashion. The line Ade recites is similar to one in television episode "Contest", when he talks about the futility of their conversation: "slime in this ear, slime in that ear". (Ade also remarks after his over-dramatic delivery, "Alan Rickman, eat your heart out!") During this sequence, Eddie claims he was born in Southampton (Ade was actually born in West Yorkshire). Rik tries to get the audience to stop laughing by telling them to pretend that they're watching Ben Elton. Near the end of this section, Rik manages to compose himself to deliver his line, to which Ade responds: "Fucking hell! A line from the play!" to great audience applause.

During a fight, Ade accidentally hits Rik on the nose for real, causing a character break by Ade to say "You all right? I actually hit you on the nose then, didn't I?"

A brief gag involving Richie's failed attempt at hiding Monica from Eddie was excluded of all home media releases of the show for unknown reasons. Footage of this gag is now considered to be lost. 

After Richie attempted to kick Eddie in the crotch in response to an insult, a metal clanging sound is heard and Richie yells in pain and asks, "What have you got up there?" to which Eddie replies, "My testicles." This scene is also from the Dangerous Brothers sketch "Crocodile Snogging."

Similarly, in the first act a visual gag wherein the pair spit out their teeth (having bitten into a Special-K brick) mirrors a similar gag in The Dangerous Brothers sketch "Exploding Politicians".

There is a part in the second act where Ade hits Rik in the crotch with a Cricket Bat. Rik responds with "Ha! Ha! Missed both my legs!" This is a reference to The Young Ones episode Oil. The same joke is done again in the Bottom Live: The Big Number Two Tour.

Rik Mayall is always the first cast member to both speak and appear on stage, shortly followed by Ade Edmondson.

References 

Bottom (TV series)